Sissako is a surname. Notable persons with the surname include:

 Abderrahmane Sissako (born 1961), Mauritanian-born Malian film director and producer
 Abdoulaye Sissako (born 1998), French footballer
 Mamadou Sissako (born 1996), French footballer
 Moussa Sissako (born 2000), French footballer

See also 
 Sissoko